Nataliya Kotsina (born ; 7 September 1991) is a Belarusian handballer playing in the Turkish Women's Handball Super League for Kastamonu Bld. GSK and the Belarısian national team. The -tall sportswoman plays in the left wing position.

In January 2015, she transferred from SHC Gorodnichanka Grodno in her country to the Antalya-based Muratpaşa Bld. SK, which play in the Turkish Women's Handball Super League. She took part at the 2015–16 Women's EHF Cup.

References

1991 births
Sportspeople from Grodno
Belarusian female handball players
Belarusian expatriate sportspeople in Turkey
Expatriate handball players in Turkey
Muratpaşa Bld. SK (women's handball) players
Living people